Matt Rogers (born March 5, 1990) is an American comedian, actor, writer, podcaster, and television host. He is best known for co-hosting the pop culture podcast Las Culturistas with Bowen Yang since 2016.

Early life and education 
Rogers was born to Richard and Katrina Rogers, and raised on Long Island, New York.

Rogers attended Islip High School and was named prom king at his senior prom. Rogers got a 31 on the ACT and a 2010 on his SAT. After graduating, he earned a BFA in dramatic writing from New York University. While studying there, Rogers became a member of the improvisational group Hammerkatz and started studying at the Upright Citizens Brigade in 2009. It was while at NYU that Rogers first met Yang.

Career 
While studying at UCB, Rogers performed in several shows, including Characters Welcome and Amazing Welcome; he also performed in the Maude team and served as the artistic director of the musical sketch comedy group Pop Roulette. In 2016, Rogers was recognized as a "Comic to Watch" by Comedy Central.

Since 2016, Rogers has co-hosted the podcast Las Culturistas with fellow NYU alumnus Bowen Yang. Guests on the show have included Alan Cumming, Bianca Del Rio, Katie Couric, Michelle Yeoh, Trixie Mattel, Sean Hayes and Will Ferrell.

In 2020, Rogers hosted two television competition series. Gayme Show, co-hosted with Dave Mizzoni, was based on a popular comedy night in which straight men were quizzed on queer culture; the show aired for one season on the streaming platform Quibi. After initially being renewed for a second series, the show's current status remains in limbo following the closure of Quibi in October 2020. Also in 2020, Rogers became the host of Haute Dog, which aired on HBO Max and saw dog groomers compete for a cash prize.

As an actor, Rogers has made guest appearances on multiple television series, including Shrill, Awkwafina Is Nora from Queens, and Search Party. In 2021, it was announced that Rogers would have a starring role on the comedy series I Love That for You, in addition to a supporting role in the film Fire Island, a gay retelling of Pride and Prejudice.

As a voice actor, Rogers serves as the voice of several recurring characters on the comedy series Our Cartoon President. Since 2021, he has voiced the character of Twink on the Netflix comedy Q-Force, on which he also serves as a writer.

In December 2022 Rogers released his musical comedy special, Have You Heard of Christmas? on Showtime. The special follows Rogers's journey to entering the Christmas canon as the "Pop Prince of Christmas". The TV special features original songs and guest appearances by Bowen Yang, Josh Sharp, and Aaron Jackson.

Rogers has been cited in academic work for his insight into the entertainment industry.

Personal life 
After an extended period of living in Brooklyn, Rogers resides in Los Angeles .

Rogers is openly gay, having come out while a student at NYU. Rogers is also famously red-green color blind.

Filmography

Film

Television

Writer

Source:

References

External links
 Official website
 

1990 births
21st-century American comedians
21st-century American male actors
21st-century American male writers
American gay actors
American gay writers
American podcasters
Comedians from New York (state)
Comedians from New York City
Gay comedians
LGBT people from New York (state)
Living people
Male actors from New York City
New York University alumni
People from Long Island
Writers from Brooklyn
Writers from Los Angeles
American LGBT comedians